LGBT reproduction refers to lesbian, gay, bisexual, and transgender (LGBT) people having biological children by means of assisted reproductive technology. It is distinct from LGBT parenting, which is a broader cultural phenomenon including LGBT adoption. In recent decades, developmental biologists have been researching and developing techniques to facilitate same-sex reproduction.

The obvious approaches, subject to a growing amount of activity, are female sperm and male eggs. In 2004, by altering the function of a few genes involved with imprinting, other Japanese scientists combined two mouse eggs to produce daughter mice and in 2018 Chinese scientists created 29 female mice from two female mice mothers but were unable to produce viable offspring from two father mice. One of the possibilities is obtaining sperm and eggs from skin stem cells.

Gay men 

Some gay couples decide to have a surrogate pregnancy. A surrogate is a woman carrying an egg fertilized by sperm of one of the men. Some women become surrogates for money, others for humanitarian reasons or both. This allows one of the men to be the biological father while the other will be an adopted father.

Gay men who have become fathers using surrogacy have reported similar experiences to those as other couples who have used surrogacy, including their relationships both their child and their surrogate have.

There is theoretical work being done on creating a zygote from two men which would enable both men to be biological fathers, but it is yet to be practically implemented.

Barrie and Tony Drewitt-Barlow from the United Kingdom became the first gay men in the country to father twins born through surrogacy in 1999.

Lesbians 

Partner-assisted reproduction, or co-IVF is a method of family building that is used by couples who both possess female reproductive organs. The method uses in vitro fertilization (IVF), a method that means eggs are removed from the ovaries, fertilized in a laboratory, and then one or more of the resulting embryos are placed in the uterus to hopefully create a pregnancy. Reciprocal IVF differs from standard IVF in that two women are involved: the eggs are taken from one partner, and the other partner carries the pregnancy. In this way, the process is mechanically identical to IVF with egg donation. Using this process ensures that each partner is a biological mother of the child according to advocates, but in the strictest sense only one mother is the biological mother from a genetic standpoint and the other is a surrogate mother. However the practice has a symbolic weight greater than LGBT adoption, and may create a stronger bond between mother and child than adoption.

In a 2019 study, quality of infant-parent relationships was examined among egg donor families in comparison to in vitro fertilization families. Infants were between the ages of 6–18 months. Through use of the Parent Development Interview (PDI) and observational assessment, the study found few differences between family types on the representational level, yet significant differences between family types on the observational level. Egg donation mothers were less sensitive and structuring than IVF mothers, and egg donation infants were less emotionally responsive, and involving than IVF infants.

There is theoretical work being done on creating a zygote from two women which would enable both women to be biological mothers, but it is yet to be practically implemented. Creating a sperm from an egg and using it to fertilize another egg may offer a solution to this issue, as could a process analogous to somatic cell nuclear transfer involving two eggs being fused together.

In 2004 and 2018 scientists were able to create mice with two mothers via egg fusion. Modification of genomic imprinting was necessary to create healthy bimaternal mice, while live bipaternal mice were created but were unhealthy likely due to genomic imprinting.

If created, a "female sperm" cell could fertilize an egg cell, a procedure that, among other potential applications, might enable female same-sex couples to produce a child who would be the biological offspring of their two mothers. It is also claimed that production of female sperm may stimulate a woman to be both the mother and father (similar to asexual reproduction) of an offspring produced by her own sperm. Many queries, both ethical and moral, arise over these arguments.

Transgender women 

Many trans women want to have children. Some may seek to have children by using their own sperm and an egg donor or biological female partner. Fertility can be impeded in a variety of ways due to feminizing hormone therapy.

Trans women may have lower sperm quality before HRT, which may pose an issue for creating viable sperm samples to freeze.

Estrogens suppress testosterone levels and at high doses can markedly disrupt sex drive and function and fertility on their own. Moreover, disruption of gonadal function and fertility by estrogens may be permanent after extended exposure.

Nonsteroidal antiandrogens like bicalutamide may be an option for transgender women who wish to preserve sex drive, sexual function, and/or fertility, relative to antiandrogens that suppress testosterone levels and can greatly disrupt these functions such as cyproterone acetate and GnRH modulators. However, estrogens suppress testosterone levels and at high doses can markedly disrupt sex drive and function and fertility on their own. Moreover, disruption of gonadal function and fertility by estrogens may be permanent after extended exposure.

Some trans women want to carry their own children through transgender pregnancy, which has its own set of issues to be overcome, because transgender women do not naturally have the anatomy needed for embryonic and fetal development. As of 2008, there were no successful cases of uterus transplantation concerning a transgender woman.

Uterine transplantation, or UTx, is currently in its infancy and is not yet publicly available. As of 2019, in cisgender women, more than 42 UTx procedures had been performed, with 12 live births resulting from the transplanted uteruses as of publication. The International Society of Uterine Transplantation (ISUTx) was established internationally in 2016, with 70 clinical doctors and scientists, and currently has 140 intercontinental delegates. Its goal is to, "through scientific innovations, advance medical care in the field of uterus transplantation."

In 2012, McGill University published the "Montreal Criteria for the Ethical Feasibility of Uterine Transplantation", a proposed set of criteria for carrying out uterine transplants, in Transplant International. Under these criteria, only a cisgender woman could ethically be considered a transplant recipient. The exclusion of trans women from candidacy may lack justification.

In addition, if trans women wish to conceive with a biological male partner, they face the same issues that cisgender gay couples have in creating a zygote.

Only 3% of transgender people take efforts to preserve their fertility in transition 51% of trans women express regrets for not preserving their fertility, and 97% of transgender adults believe it should be discussed before transition.

Transfeminine lactation 

Lactation in trans women is an understudied area. A survey of trans healthcare providers found 34% met trans women who expressed interest in inducing lactation. The first documented instance of a trans woman attempting to breastfeed was in 2018 using domperidone to induce lactation. In 2021 lactation was successfully induced in a trans woman.

To induce lactation, domperidone is used at a dosage of 10 to 20 mg 3 or 4 times per day by mouth. Effects may be seen within 24 hours or may not be seen for 3 or 4 days. The maximum effect occurs after 2 or 3 weeks of treatment, and the treatment period generally lasts for 3 to 8 weeks.

Transgender men 

Transgender men have a unique situation when it comes to LGBT reproduction as they are one of the only groups that has a risk of unintended pregnancy in a same-gender relationship (cisgender lesbians in relationships with fertile trans women being another example). Pregnancy is possible for transgender men who retain a functioning vagina, ovaries, and a uterus.

Testosterone therapy affects fertility, but many trans men who have become pregnant were able to do so within six months of stopping testosterone.  Another study conducted in 2019 found that transgender male patients seeking oocyte retrieval for either oocyte cryopreservation, embryo cryopreservation, or IVF were able to ​​undergo treatment 4 months after stopping testosterone treatment, on average. All patients experienced menses and normal AMH, FSH, and E2 levels and antral follicle counts after coming off testosterone which allowed for successful oocyte retrieval. Although the long-term effects of androgen treatment on fertility is still widely unknown, oocyte retrieval does not appear to be affected. Future pregnancies can be achieved by oophyte banking, but the process may increase gender dysphoria or may not be accessible due to lack of insurance coverage. Testosterone therapy is not a sufficient method of contraception, and trans men may experience unintended pregnancy, especially if they miss doses.

Many gay transgender men choose to freeze their eggs before transitioning, and choose to have a female surrogate carry their child while when the time comes, using their eggs and their cis male partner's sperm. This allows them to avoid the potentially dysphoria inducing experience of pregnancy, or cessation of HRT for collecting eggs at an older age.

Some studies report a higher incidence of PCOS among transgender men prior to taking testosterone, the disease causes infertility and can make it harder for trans men to freeze eggs, though not all have not found the same association of trans men and PCOS. People with PCOS in general are also reportedly more likely to see themselves as "sexually undifferentiated" or "androgynous" and "less likely to identify with a female gender scheme."

In popular culture 

Male pregnancy is commonly explored in slash (homosexual) fan fiction, usually based upon fantasy series such as Supernatural or Harry Potter.

In the Omegaverse themes of LGBT reproduction are common. Alpha females are able to impregnate both males and females, and Omega males are able to be impregnated by both males and females.

Between Alphas and Betas, only females can carry on a pregnancy, but male Omegas are often envisaged as being able to become pregnant via an uterus connected to the rectum, and Alphas can impregnate regardless of their main gender.  To make penetration and impregnation easier, male Omegas often have self-lubricating anuses.

See also 
Male pregnancy
 LGBT parenting
 Transgender pregnancy
 Female sperm
 Male egg

References 

Assisted reproductive technology
Fertility medicine
LGBT parenting
Human reproduction
LGBT and health care